Angela McKee (née Warner) (born 1 December 1974 in Henderson, New Zealand) is a former high jumper for New Zealand.

At the 2006 Commonwealth Games she won a bronze medal with a jump of 1.83m.

References

External links

1974 births
Living people
Athletes (track and field) at the 2006 Commonwealth Games
Commonwealth Games bronze medallists for New Zealand
Commonwealth Games medallists in athletics
New Zealand female high jumpers
Sportspeople from the Auckland Region
Medallists at the 2006 Commonwealth Games